The Muli pika (Ochotona muliensis) is a species of mammal in the family Ochotonidae. It is endemic to China.  Its natural habitat is temperate grassland. It is threatened by habitat loss.

It is a rarely found, one of the six pika species endemic to central China, with no true population studies.

References

Notes

Bibliography

Mammals of China
Pikas
Mammals described in 1962
Taxonomy articles created by Polbot
Taxobox binomials not recognized by IUCN